Neva A. Gilbert (September 1, 1929 – November 12, 2022) was an American model.  She was Playboy magazine's Playmate of the Month for its July 1954 issue.

Early life 
Gilbert was born in New York City and started work at Sears and Roebuck by lying about her age in order to be eligible. She was married at age 16 and divorced within a few years.

Career
After moving to California Gilbert began modeling, and her acting roles included working with Marilyn Monroe. When Playboy was launched, it did not commission its own photo sessions. Gilbert's photos were actually taken by a private photographer, Tom Kelley, the same photographer who photographed Monroe and who sold Gilbert's photos to the Baumgarth Calendar Company. Hugh Hefner bought her photos, (along with the photos of many other models), and, unbeknownst to Gilbert, published them. Gilbert was the seventh playmate in the first year playmates appeared in Playboy magazine.

According to Gilbert,

Gilbert had small parts in two films: Combat Squad (1953) and The Country Girl (1954). She also appeared in various off-Broadway and college theatre productions, especially the plays of Tennessee Williams. Decades later, she returned to Playboy and posed semi-nude for a feature called, "Playmates Forever!", in the December 1979 issue.

Later life and death
By 2017 Gilbert was the oldest Playmate, and told an ABC News reporter that she was still looking for work.

Gilbert died in Lake Worth, Florida on November 12, 2022, at the age of 93.

Filmography
 The Country Girl (1954) as Lady
 Combat Squad (1953) as Virginia

See also
 List of people in Playboy 1953–59

References

External links
 
 

1929 births
2022 deaths
1950s Playboy Playmates
American models
Models from New York City
Actresses from New York City